Old Town is the historic original town site of Albuquerque, New Mexico, for the provincial kingdom of Santa Fe de Nuevo México, established in 1706 by New Mexico governor Francisco Cuervo y Valdés. It is listed on the New Mexico State Register of Cultural Properties as the Old Albuquerque Historic District, and is protected by a special historic zoning designation by the city. The present-day district contains about ten blocks of historic adobe buildings surrounding Old Town Plaza. On the plaza's north side stands San Felipe de Neri Church, a Spanish colonial church constructed in 1793.

Old Town is a popular tourist destination with a large number of restaurants, shops, and galleries, and is also home to the Albuquerque Museum of Art and History. The New Mexico Museum of Natural History and Science and the Explora science center are located a short distance to the northeast. Old Town is known for its luminaria displays during the holiday season, particularly on Christmas Eve.

Layout
At the center is Old Town Plaza, surrounded by approximately ten blocks of one- and two-story buildings. The central plaza layout was favored by Spanish colonial authorities and is found in many other cities and towns throughout New Mexico, including Santa Fe, Taos, Las Vegas, and Mesilla. The area around Old Town was originally acequia fed farmland, but it has been covered over by 20th century urban development, however, land to the north and south of the plaza continues to operate for agricultural purposes with the acequia traditions, including Los Ranchos, Corrales, South Valley, and Isleta Village Proper.

History

The Spanish villa of Alburquerque was founded in 1706 by Francisco Cuervo y Valdés, who was the governor of New Mexico at the time. Cuervo reported that the new settlement was home to 252 residents and had been laid out with streets, a plaza, and a church in accordance with the town planning regulations set forth in the Laws of the Indies. Cuervo's account had been exaggerated in order to offer a centralized Villa to better serve the already existent Hispano and Pueblo communities. Those communities included Barelas, Corrales, Isleta Pueblo, Los Ranchos, Sandia Pueblo, and others along the Rio Grande rather than a centralized settlement. After a formal investigation, the villa was allowed to keep its title, especially as it was established to serve those communities as an outpost on Camino Real de Tierra Adentro.

Like other Spanish colonial settlements, Albuquerque consisted of a central plaza surrounded by houses, government offices, and a church. For much of the 18th century, the homes around the plaza were inhabited only on Sundays as the residents spent the rest of the week on their farms. It was not until the late 1700s that a permanent population was established at the plaza. Possession of Albuquerque, along with the rest of New Mexico, passed to Mexico in 1821 following the Mexican War of Independence.

In 1846, during the Mexican–American War, U.S. forces under Stephen W. Kearny entered New Mexico and were able to take control of the territory without resistance. Kearny marched into Albuquerque in September to raise the U.S. flag and administer an oath of allegiance to the local residents. Kearny's troops established a U.S. Army post near the plaza, which brought an influx of goods and people over the next twenty years. The 1860 Census showed a population of 1,608, of which the army garrison made up about a third. During the U.S. Civil War, Confederate troops under Henry Hopkins Sibley captured the town in March 1862 but were later forced to retreat back to Texas after losing most of their supplies at the Battle of Glorieta Pass. Albuquerque saw minor action when the retreating Confederates were involved in a skirmish with Union troops in the Battle of Albuquerque. For the most part, however, the town remained a quiet agricultural community.

This led to the creation of a rival "New Albuquerque" (now Downtown Albuquerque) which quickly boomed thanks to the railroad and was incorporated as the City of Albuquerque in 1891. The original town, now called Old Albuquerque, entered a decline as businesses and institutions moved to New Town. The county courthouse was moved in 1926, and by the 1930s barely any businesses were still operating around the plaza. Old Town's fortunes began to improve in the 1940s as Albuquerque citizens began to take note of Old Town's historic value, and the Old Albuquerque Historical Society was established in 1946. Old Town was annexed by the city in 1949, bringing municipal improvements like paved streets and sidewalks for the first time. Since then, Old Town has developed into a popular tourist attraction, with most of the adobe houses re-purposed into shops, restaurants, and galleries.

The plaza
Old Town Plaza dates to the original founding of the city in the early 1700s and remains the center of Old Town. It was originally larger than today, extending to the south and east, but was reduced to its present size by the late 1800s. In the 1850s, a  flagpole was erected in the center of the plaza by the U.S. Army. The adobe wall surrounding the plaza was replaced with a picket fence in 1881 and then a stone wall built by the Works Progress Administration in 1937. The WPA's walls and bandstand were unpopular and were removed just eleven years later through a grassroots effort organized by the Old Albuquerque Historical Society. The historical society also oversaw construction of a new bandstand, new landscaping, and installation of 16 wrought iron benches purchased from Chihuahua, Mexico.

At the east end of the plaza is a display of two replica M1835 mountain howitzers. During the Civil War, retreating Confederate forces buried eight howitzers near the plaza in 1862 to prevent them from falling into Union hands. The guns were rediscovered in 1889 with the help of the former Confederate artillery commander, who still remembered their location. Two of the howitzers were put on display in the plaza but were later moved to the Albuquerque Museum of Art and History and replaced with replicas. At the west end of the plaza is a display of various flags which have flown over the city, including those of Spain, Mexico, and the United States. There was also a Confederate flag reflecting the brief occupation of the city by Confederate forces, but it was removed in 2015 amid the ongoing controversy surrounding such symbols.

Buildings
Most of the historic buildings in Old Town were built between 1870 and 1900, though some are older. Only one building, San Felipe de Neri Church, is proven to date to the Spanish colonial period. During the 20th century, many of the buildings were remodeled to facilitate modern commercial use, often including historically insensitive conversion of authentic vernacular and Victorian architectural details to a more idealized Territorial or Pueblo Revival style. Other buildings have been better preserved.

Five properties in Old Town are listed on the National Register of Historic Places:
Salvador Armijo House, built c. 1840
Charles A. Bottger House, built in 1912
Our Lady of the Angels School, built in 1878
San Felipe de Neri Church, built in 1793
Antonio Vigil House, built in 1879

Notes

References

External links

 
 Historic Old Town at cabq.gov
 Historic Old Town Albuquerque, a Flickr photostream by City of Albuquerque Cultural Services

Neighborhoods in Albuquerque, New Mexico
History of Albuquerque, New Mexico
Historic districts in New Mexico
Tourist attractions in Albuquerque, New Mexico
New Mexico State Register of Cultural Properties